"Never Wanted Nothing More" is a song written by Ronnie Bowman and Chris Stapleton and recorded by American country music artist Kenny Chesney. It was released in June 2007 as the first single from Chesney’s 2007 album Just Who I Am: Poets & Pirates. To date, it is his fastest-climbing number one single, reaching the top of the U.S. Billboard Hot Country Songs chart on its eighth chart week.

On the Billboard chart dated for the week of June 16, 2007, "Never Wanted Nothing More" debuted at number 37, due to airplay received before its official release. The song received airplay 56 hours before its official release date. The next chart week, it moved up from number 37 to number 17, and reached number one in its eighth chart week.

Content
The song is a moderate up-tempo, accompanied by acoustic guitar and banjo. It features the narrator's recollections of the major highlights of his life, such as buying his first car, losing his virginity, getting married, and finding the Lord. With each recollection, he states that he "never wanted nothing more" than to do what he has done.

Critical reception
Kevin John Coyne of Country Universe gave the song a "B+" and said that it is a "surprisingly twangy single, all plucky banjos and the like" and that it was a "promising first look at what will certainly be one of the year’s biggest albums."

Chart performance
The song debuted at number 37 on the U.S. Billboard Hot Country Songs charts for the week of June 16, 2007.

Year-end charts

Certifications

References

2007 singles
2007 songs
Kenny Chesney songs
Songs written by Ronnie Bowman
Songs written by Chris Stapleton
Song recordings produced by Buddy Cannon
BNA Records singles